Cal is the second soundtrack album by British singer-songwriter and guitarist Mark Knopfler, released on 24 August 1984 by Vertigo Records. The album contains music composed for the 1984 film Cal, produced by David Puttnam and directed by Pat O'Connor. Puttnam also produced the film Local Hero (1983).

Critical reception

In a contemporary review in The New York Times, Janet Maslin called the album "an exceptionally lovely and haunting score."

In a retrospective review for AllMusic, Steven McDonald gave the album four out of five stars and called it a "quiet, reflective set of cues that eschew false dramatics in favor of supporting the story."

Track listing
All music was written by Mark Knopfler.

Charts

Personnel
Music
 Mark Knopfler – guitars
 Paul Brady – tin whistle, mandolin
 Liam O'Flynn – Uilleann pipes
 Guy Fletcher – keyboards
 John Illsley – bass
 Terry Williams – drums

Production
 Mark Knopfler – producer
 Neil Dorfsman – engineer
 Matt d'Arbanlay-Butler – assistant engineer
 Steve Jackson – assistant engineer
 John Dent – mastering at the Sound Clinic in London
 Sutton Cooper – sleeve design
 Brian Aris – photograph of Mark Knopfler

References

External links
 Cal at Mark Knopfler official website
 

1984 soundtrack albums
Albums produced by Mark Knopfler
Mark Knopfler soundtracks
Vertigo Records soundtracks
Drama film soundtracks
1980s film soundtrack albums